Rhenium(VII) sulfide is a chemical compound with the formula Re2S7. It can be produced through the reaction of ReO4− and H2S in 4N HCl.

Synthesis
 Direct combination of rhenium and sulfur:

 Treating rhenium(VII) oxide with hydrogen sulfide:

Reactions

Rhenium(VII) sulfide decomposes when heated in vacuum:

It is converted to oxide when heated in air:

References

Химическая энциклопедия / Редкол.: Кнунянц И.Л. и др.. — М.: Советская энциклопедия, 1995. — Т. 4. — 639 с. —  
Справочник химика / Редкол.: Никольский Б.П. и др.. — 3-е изд., испр. — Л.: Химия, 1971. — Т. 2. — 1168 с. 
Рипан Р., Четяну И. Неорганическая химия. Химия металлов. — М.: Мир, 1972. — Т. 2. — 871 с. 

Rhenium compounds
Sulfides